Jefferson Pereira de Oliveira (born 25 May 2000), commonly known as Jefferson Pereira, is a Brazilian professional footballer.

Career statistics

Club
.

Notes

References

2000 births
Living people
Footballers from São Paulo (state)
Brazilian footballers
Association football defenders
Kategoria e Parë players
Associação Atlética Internacional (Limeira) players
Sertãozinho Futebol Clube players
Comercial Futebol Clube (Ribeirão Preto) players
Brazilian expatriate footballers
Brazilian expatriate sportspeople in Albania
Expatriate footballers in Albania
People from Santa Rosa de Viterbo, São Paulo